Everything is Amplified is the third studio album by the Danish electrorock band VETO. It was released February 2011.

Track listing 

2011 albums